Kārlis Ozoliņš (August 31, 1905 — 15 August 1987) was a Latvian Soviet politician and journalist.

Biography 
Ozoliņš was born in to a poor peasant family. He became a member of social democratic organizations from his teenage years.

From 1924 he was involved in anti-state activities and joined the Communist Party of Latvia in 1926. In 1927 he was arrested and sentenced to three years in prison for the distribution of communist propaganda.

After his release, he became a professional revolutionary, led a college of propagandists and worked as a secretary of the underground Riga party committee. He was arrested for the second time and served a prison sentence and spent a total of ten years behind bars.

After the annexation of Latvia to the Soviet Union in 1940 he worked in the apparatus of the Central Committee of the Communist Party of Latvia and became the executive editor of the newspaper Cīņa.  He was elected a member of the Central Committee and Politburo of the Communist Party of Latvia.

During the Great Patriotic War, he led the task force of the Central Committee of the Communist Party of Latvia for the organization of underground anti-fascist formations and partisan movements in the occupied republic and was responsible for the publication of the newspaper "For Soviet Latvia".

After the liberation of Latvia he continued to edit the newspaper of the LCP and became a secretary of the Central Committee. He was member of the Union of Lativan Writers.

From 1951 to 1952 deputy and from 1952 to 1959 he was Chairman of the Supreme Soviet of the Latvian SSR.

After the persecution of the "national communists" Ozoliņš was removed from his posts and demoted.

Until 1961 he once again served as deputy chairman of the Supreme Soviet.

References 

 

1905 births
1987 deaths
People from Ogre Municipality
People from Kreis Riga
Members of the Central Committee of the Communist Party of Latvia
Heads of state of the Latvian Soviet Socialist Republic
Members of the Supreme Soviet of the Latvian Soviet Socialist Republic, 1947–1951
Members of the Supreme Soviet of the Latvian Soviet Socialist Republic, 1951–1955
Members of the Supreme Soviet of the Latvian Soviet Socialist Republic, 1955–1959
Members of the Supreme Soviet of the Latvian Soviet Socialist Republic, 1959–1963
Third convocation members of the Supreme Soviet of the Soviet Union
Fourth convocation members of the Supreme Soviet of the Soviet Union
Fifth convocation members of the Supreme Soviet of the Soviet Union
Latvian journalists
Soviet journalists
Soviet newspaper editors
Recipients of the Order of Lenin
Recipients of the Order of the Red Banner of Labour
Recipients of the Order of the Red Star
Recipients of the Order of Friendship of Peoples
Marxist journalists